Ken Choy is an American writer of Chinese-Native Hawaiian ethnicity. He also is a performance artist and actor and owns and operates a shopping business in Southern California.

Choy was the subject of a two-part series on KCBS-TV Los Angeles that featured his book, "Make Money Shopping," his web site, Makemoneyshopping.org, and his shopping and mystery shopping business.

Theatre and activism 
Upon arriving in the Twin Cities, Choy immediately involved himself in the Asian American Renaissance, an Asian American arts organization. He taught classes and hosted AARGH!!, the Asian American Cabaret with poet and performance artist David Mura.

In 1992, Choy toured his one-man show Buzz Off Butterfly around the country. Under the auspices of the performance group he founded, Asian Pacific American Renegades, he also directed and organized the large scale Asian American performance presentation at the Walker Art Center, "Miss Appropriated." He is discussed in Dorinne K. Kondo's "About Face," and Linda Frye Burnham's "High Performance" as well as David A. Schlossman's "Actors and Activists," and Deborah Wong's "Speak it Louder".

In 1993, Choy, along with Juliana Pegues, staged a protest at the Minnesota Opera performance of Madama Butterfly. Choy and Pegues protested inside the theater during the performance and were arrested for disorderly conduct. Although Choy was dressed in women's clothing, erroneous press accounts stated that he was naked. The two were ordered to pay a $25 fine.

In 1994, Choy received $5,000 as part of the Playwright's Center Jerome Fellowship in Minnesota. The program stated that he used the grant "for three months of travel and study in the Hawaiian Islands," researching and interviewing the family members and island natives, "focusing on disenfranchisement and the disappearance of island culture due to industrialization, white settlement, tourism and environmental racism."

Choy founded and was co-chair of PAVE (Pan Asian Voices for Equality) and the Miss Saigon Protest Committee with Rita Nakashima Brock.

Writing 
Choy is the author of the novel "My Loveable Combustible Asian American Nuclear Family" and his video blog, "From Chaos to Love: "My Loveable Combustible Asian American Nuclear Family" journey.

He is the creator of the journalistic dialectic, "Living with Bill and Rob," an ongoing research project which explores the link between racism and mental illness and how those both are unflinchingly harnessed as a viable excuse for lack of human and community involvement and participation. Choy traversed those manifestations in a roommate situation with the titular subjects.

His screenplay Lazy Susan won first place in the Boulder Asian Film Festival in 2005.

Festivals and conventions 
Choy is the producer and founder of Breaking the Bow: The Independent Asian Pacific Islander Performing Artists and Writers Festival. The 1st festival was held October 22–25, 2009. The festival was produced by Mavericks of Asian Pacific Islander Descent (MAPID). Choy founded MAPID.

Choy co-organized ID Film Fest and the Asian American Independent Features Conference with Quentin Lee and Koji Steven Sakai in October 2010 at the Japanese American National Museum, continuing with his Battle of the Pitches competition along with the API TV Pilot Shootout and a Filmmaker's Crash Course.

He has moderated panels at Wondercon and Comic-Con.

Notable Theater Works 
 Charlene Chan in "Me?"
 Sticky Substances
 Buzz off Butterfly
 Miss Appropriated
 Ken Choy's Theatrical Extravaganza Lazy Susan

References

External links
 
 MAPID home page

American performance artists
American male actors
American dramatists and playwrights of Chinese descent
American writers of Chinese descent
American gay actors
American gay artists
American gay writers
American LGBT people of Asian descent
LGBT Native Hawaiians
Year of birth missing (living people)
Living people
American LGBT dramatists and playwrights
American male dramatists and playwrights
American dramatists and playwrights